Samedi is the French word for Saturday. It may also refer to:

Baron Samedi, a major loa (spirit) in the vodun/voodoo mythology
Samedi (World of Darkness), a fictional vampire bloodline in White Wolf Game Studio's Vampire: The Masquerade setting
Sons of Samedi, a Haitian gang from the 2008 game Saints Row 2
Samedi the Deafness, a novel by Jesse Ball